Stolen Transmission was an American independent record label founded in 2005 by Sarah Lewitinn and Rob Stevenson.  They have released albums from well-known artists such as Innerpartysystem, Monty Are I, and Schoolyard Heroes.

History
The label started in 2005 by former Spin editor, Sarah Lewitinn, who quit the magazine to create the label, and Rob Stevenson, a music executive for Island Def Jam.  It began as an imprint of Island Def Jam. It lasted 2 years without any major commercial or critical success.

In late 2007, Stolen Transmission parted ways with Island Def Jam due to the reconstruction of it, and Stolen Transmission ran completely independent for a few months. The label is defunct since 2008.

Artists
The Audition
Bright Light Fever
The Horrors
Innerpartysystem
Monty Are I
The Oohlas
Permanent Me
The Photo Atlas
Schoolyard Heroes

Former
PlayRadioPlay!
Saints and Lovers

References

External links
Official site

American independent record labels
Record labels established in 2005